Flighting may refer to:

Flighting (advertising), a technique for scheduling broadcast commercials
Flighting (cricket), changing the speed of delivery in order to deceive the batsman
Flighting, the helical blade of an auger (drill)